Presidency of Lula da Silva may refer to:

First presidency of Lula da Silva
Second presidency of Lula da Silva